Tiberius Claudius Pompeianus Quintianus (170 – between 212 and 217) was the son of Syrian Roman Consul Tiberius Claudius Pompeianus.

During the reign of Roman Emperor Caracalla (211-217), Pompeianus was put in charge of the Roman military campaigns and awarded two consulships, one as a Suffectus in 212. However, he appears to have been murdered during a robbery.

References

Sources
https://web.archive.org/web/20071007063958/http://www.ancientlibrary.com/smith-bio/2806.html

170 births
210s deaths
2nd-century Romans
3rd-century Romans
Imperial Roman consuls
Claudii
Ancient Roman murder victims